Sheshakriya is a 1982 Indian Malayalam film, directed by Ravi Alummoodu and produced by Suresh Venganoor. The film stars Aranmula Hariharaputhran, Jalaja, John Samuel and P. V. Narayanan in the lead roles.

Cast
Aranmula Hariharaputhran
Jalaja
John Samuel
P. V. Narayanan

References

External links
 

1982 films
1980s Malayalam-language films